Coos County is one of the 36 counties in the U.S. state of Oregon. As of the 2020 census, the population was 64,929. The county seat is Coquille. The county was formed from the western parts of Umpqua and Jackson counties. It is named after a tribe of Native Americans who live in the region. Coos County comprises the Coos Bay, OR Micropolitan Statistical Area.

History
The name Coos originated from the name of the Native American tribe that had settled the area. "Coos" loosely translates to "lake" or "place of pines".  Lewis and Clark noted Cook-koo-oose.  Early maps and documents spelled it Kowes, Cowes, Coose, Koos, among others.

Although exploration and trapping in the area occurred as early as 1828, the first European-American settlement was established at Empire City in 1853 by members of the Coos Bay Company; this is now part of Coos Bay, Oregon.

Coos County was created by the Territorial Legislature from parts of Umpqua, and Jackson counties on December 22, 1853. Curry County, Oregon, was created from the southern part in 1855. The county seat was originally at Empire City. In 1895 the legislature permitted the citizens of the county to choose a new county seat. The 1896 vote resulted in moving the seat to Coquille.

The Territorial Legislature granted permission for the development of wagon roads from Coos Bay to Jacksonville, Oregon, in 1854, and to Roseburg, Oregon, in 1857.

Geography

Adjacent counties
Douglas County - north and east
Curry County - south

National protected areas
Bandon Marsh National Wildlife Refuge
Oregon Islands National Wildlife Refuge (part)
Siskiyou National Forest (part)
Siuslaw National Forest (part)

Demographics

2000 census
As of the census of 2000, there were 62,779 people, 26,213 households, and 17,457 families living in the county.  The population density was 39 people per square mile (15/km2).  There were 29,247 housing units at an average density of 18 per square mile (7/km2).  The racial makeup of the county was 91.97% White, 0.31% Black or African American, 2.41% Native American, 0.90% Asian, 0.17% Pacific Islander, 1.06% from other races, and 3.17% from two or more races.  3.40% of the population were Hispanic or Latino of any race. 18.5% were of German, 12.4% English, 11.3% Irish and 10.7% U.S. or American ancestry. 96.0% spoke English and 2.5% Spanish as their first language.

There were 26,213 households, out of which 26.00% had children under the age of 18 living with them, 52.90% were married couples living together, 9.90% had a female householder with no husband present, and 33.40% were non-families. 27.20% of all households were made up of individuals, and 12.30% had someone living alone who was 65 years of age or older.  The average household size was 2.34 and the average family size was 2.80.

In the county, the population dispersal was 21.90% under the age of 18, 7.10% from 18 to 24, 24.00% from 25 to 44, 27.80% from 45 to 64, and 19.10% who were 65 years of age or older.  The median age was 43 years. For every 100 females there were 96.10 males.  For every 100 females age 18 and over, there were 93.90 males. The median income for a household in the county was $31,542, and the median income for a family was $38,040. Males had a median income of $32,509 versus $22,519 for females. The per capita income for the county was $17,547.  About 11.10% of families and 15.00% of the population were below the poverty line, including 19.90% of those under age 18 and 9.40% of those age 65 or over.

2010 census
As of the 2010 census, there were 63,043 people, 27,133 households, and 16,857 families living in the county. The racial makeup of the county was 89.8% white, 2.5% Native American, 1.0% Asian, 0.4% black or African American, 0.2% Pacific islander, 1.7% from other races, and 4.3% from two or more races. Those of Hispanic or Latino origin made up 5.4% of the population. In terms of ancestry, 22.9% were German, 15.0% were English, 12.7% were Irish, 7.4% were American, and 5.2% were Scottish.

Of the 27,133 households, 24.2% had children under the age of 18 living with them, 47.2% were married couples living together, 10.2% had a female householder with no husband present, 37.9% were non-families, and 29.8% of all households were made up of individuals. The average household size was 2.29 and the average family size was 2.78. The median age was 47.3 years.

The median income for a household in the county was $37,491 and the median income for a family was $46,569. Males had a median income of $39,744 versus $28,328 for females. The per capita income for the county was $21,981. About 11.5% of families and 16.4% of the population were below the poverty line, including 21.4% of those under age 18 and 8.1% of those age 65 or over.

Communities

Cities
Bandon
Coos Bay
Coquille (county seat)
Lakeside
Myrtle Point
North Bend
Powers

Census-designated places
Barview
Bunker Hill
Glasgow
Saunders Lake

Other unincorporated communities

Allegany
Arago
Beaver Hill
Bridge
Broadbent
Charleston
Cooston
Dellwood
Dora
Fairview
Gaylord
Gravelford
Green Acres
Hauser
Laurel Grove
Leneve
Libby
McKinley
Millington
Norway
Prosper
Randolph
Remote
Riverton
Sitkum
Sumner
Tenmile

Politics
Coos County at one time favored the Democratic Party and was one of the few counties in the West to be won by George McGovern. No Republican presidential candidate obtained a majority in the county between 1956 and 1996, although Ronald Reagan did obtain pluralities in both 1980 and – very narrowly – in 1984. Since the turn of the century it has become a solidly Republican county in Presidential elections as a result of de-unionization in the timber industry and opposition to Democratic environmental policies. The last Democrat to win a majority in Coos County was Michael Dukakis in 1988, although Bill Clinton won pluralities in both his elections.

In the United States House of Representatives, Coos County in located in Oregon's 4th congressional district, which also includes the more left-leaning Eugene metropolitan area and has been represented by Democrat Val Hoyle since 2023. In the Oregon State Senate, the county is split between the 5th District, represented by Republican Dick Anderson, and the 1st District, represented by Republican David Brock Smith. In the Oregon House of Representatives, it is split between the 9th District, represented by Republican, Boomer Wright, and the 1st District, represented by Republican Court Boice. All legislative seats, as of 2021, are held by Republicans in the Oregon State legislature.

Economy

Deposits of gold initially attracted people to the county in the nineteenth century. Between 1890 and 1910, large amounts of coal were mined in the county and shipped to California; production decreased after oil was discovered in that state, and no coal mines in the county have been in production since 1950. These coal fields have been explored for natural gas since 1938, although CDX Gas, a company based in Texas announced in 2003 that they would be drilling two test wells later that year.

A project to build a  natural gas pipeline between the cities of Roseburg and Coos Bay, which would attract new industry to the Coos Bay area, was begun in 1999 when voters approved a local bond measure to raise as much as $27 million, with the state of Oregon providing $24 million. The pipeline construction began in June 2003 and was finished in 2004.

Currently, forest products, tourism, fishing and agriculture dominate the Coos County economy. The service industry is replacing the former lumber-driven economy. Bandon Dunes Golf Resort, north of Bandon and south of Coos Bay, attracts tourists and golfers from around the world. Boating, dairy farming, myrtlewood manufacturing, shipbuilding and repair and agriculture specialty products, including cranberries, also play an important role. Untapped rich deposits of iron ore and lead await development.

The Jordan Cove Energy Project is a project that was met with resistance since 2010 by farm owners and other land owners, tribal natives, and some commercial entities who did not want their land being used or taken without their permission, with eminent domain. The project was cancelled in late 2021.

A current project underway in Coos County, undertaken by Oregon Resources Corporation (ORC), uses modern strip-mining techniques to extract chromite, zircon, and garnet from local sands. The tailings after processing will be returned and re-contoured to replicate pre-mining conditions, and the affected area will be reforested. Job numbers are not listed on the company website but an annual payroll of $3.5 million is listed in the economic impact portion of the FAQ. The Oregon League of Women Voters cited similar numbers from ORC, wholly owned by Industrial Mineral Corporation of Australia; the operation was projected to create 70 to 80 jobs with a salary of $46,000 per year. Efforts to block the project because of health and environmental concerns did not succeed.

There are several port districts in the county: Port of Coos Bay founded in 1909, Port of Coquille River founded in 1912, and Port of Bandon founded in 1913. Coos Bay is considered the best natural harbor between San Francisco Bay and the Puget Sound, and the Port of Coos Bay was the largest forest products shipper in the world until late 2005 when raw log exports via transport ship were suspended.

Natural history

See also
National Register of Historic Places listings in Coos County, Oregon
Steamboats of the Coquille River
Steamboats of Coos Bay

Notes

References

Further reading

External links
Coos County, Oregon (official website)
Coos Historical & Maritime Museum
 COOSonline.com  (free online community)
Coos County History

 
Oregon placenames of Native American origin
1853 establishments in Oregon Territory
Populated places established in 1853